Kejan (also Romanized as Kejān and Kajān) is a village in Baharestan Rural District, in the Central District of Nain County, Isfahan Province, Iran. At the 2006 census, its population was 573, in 195 families.

References 

Populated places in Nain County